The Net Lake-Vermilion Lake Deformation Zone, also known as the Net Lake-Vermilion Lake Zone of Deformation, is a zone of deformation in Temagami, Ontario, Canada, extending from Vermilion Lake to Net Lake in a northeasterly direction.

See also
Link Lake Deformation Zone
Northeast Arm Deformation Zone
Tasse Lake Deformation Zone

References

Geologic faults of Temagami
Strathy Township
Shear zones